During the 1997–98 season, Betis competed in La Liga, Copa del Rey and UEFA Cup Winners' Cup.

Summary
In the summertime Llorenc Serra Ferrer left the club and signed with FC Barcelona prompting President Manuel Ruiz de Lopera to hire Luis Aragonés as its new manager. The club transferred in several players such as centre back Roberto Solozabal from Atlético Madrid, right back Jorge Otero from Valencia CF, midfielder Fernando from Real Valladolid, forward Oli from Real Oviedo and after a two-year stint in FC Barcelona striker Ángel Cuéllar got back to the squad.

The team finished in a disappointing 8th place in La Liga and reached barely the classification for the UEFA Cup next season. Meanwhile, the squad was eliminated in Copa del Rey Quarterfinals by Real Zaragoza and defeated in two legs by Chelsea F.C. in UEFA Cup Winners' Cup Quarterfinals stage.

Squad
Squad at end of season

Transfers

Competitions

La Liga

League table

Results by round

Matches

Copa del Rey

Eightfinals

Quarterfinals

UEFA Cup Winners' Cup

First round

Eightfinals

Quarterfinals

Statistics

Players statistics

References

Real Betis seasons
Real Betis